Bertha Schrader (11 June 1845 – 11 May 1920) was a German painter, lithographer, and woodblock print-maker.

Biography
Schrader was born on 11 June 1845 in Memel, Lithuania. She studied with Carl Graeb's son Paul Graeb (1842-1892) in Berlin, and with Paul Baum (1854-1932) in Dresden.  From 1882 to 1916 Schrader was a member of the Verein der Berliner Künstlerinnen (Association of Berlin Artists) where she exhibited her paintings. She was also a member of the Dresden Women Artists Association, serving as the chairwoman.

She exhibited her work at the Woman's Building at the 1893 World's Columbian Exposition in Chicago, Illinois.

Schrader died on 11 May 1920 in Dresden.

References

External links
  
 images of Schrader's work on ArtNet

1845 births
1920 deaths
German women painters
19th-century German women artists
20th-century German women artists
19th-century German painters
20th-century German painters